The International Socialist was a newspaper published in Sydney, Australia from 1910 to 1920. It has also been published as International Socialist Review for Australasia.

History
The International Socialist Review for Australasia was first published on 30 April 1910. It was printed and published by Henry Edmund Holland from 1910 to 1920 for the International Socialists, and by William Robert Winspear after 4 November 1916 for the Sydney Branch of the Australasian Socialist Party. It was labelled as the Official organ of revolutionary socialism in N.S.W. and later
continued to be published as The International Communist. The newspaper in 1920 became The Australian Communist following the formation of the Communist Party of Australia.

Digitisation
This paper has been digitised as part of the Australian Newspapers Digitisation Program project of the National Library of Australia.

See also
 List of newspapers in Australia
 List of newspapers in New South Wales

References

External links
 

Defunct newspapers published in Sydney